Rhydyfelin (High Level) Halt railway station once served the village of Rhydyfelin in South Wales.

History
The station opened in 1904 on the Pontypridd, Caerphilly and Newport Railway to cater to the new railmotor service on the line. As opened, it consisted of a single ground-level wooden platform made of old sleepers and a level crossing, also at ground-level. In 1922, the station was renamed to avoid confusion with the similarly named halt on the former Cardiff Railway, which subsequently became Rhydyfelin (Low Level) Halt. This had two wooden platforms and a corrugated tin shelter.

Closure
The halt closed in 1953 and no trace of it remains. The  trackbed is now part of the Treforest-Nantgarw cycleway.

Notes

References
J. Hutton (1996) The Newport Docks & Railway Company. Silver Link Publishing

Railway stations in Great Britain opened in 1904
Railway stations in Great Britain closed in 1953
Former Great Western Railway stations
Disused railway stations in Rhondda Cynon Taf